SM Station is a digital music project by South Korean record label SM Entertainment. It undertook to release one digital single every Friday starting from February 3, 2016.

Compilation album

Season

2016–2017: Season 1

2017–2018: Season 2

2018–2019: Season 3

2020–2023: Season 4

Special

2018: Station X 0

2019: SM Station X 4 LOVEs for Winter

2020: Our Beloved BoA

2021–2023: MV Remastering Project

2022: NCT Lab

Notes

References 

Discographies of South Korean artists
SM Town
SM Entertainment
K-pop discographies